The Mount Sneffels Wilderness is a wilderness area in southwest Colorado managed by the Uncompahgre National Forest. The word "Sneffels" is likely an Americanization of the Old Norse word for Snæfell "snow mountain," which is also the namesake of the Snæfellsnes peninsula and Snæfellsjökull volcano in Iceland.

References

Wilderness areas of Colorado
San Juan Mountains (Colorado)
Uncompahgre National Forest
Protected areas of Ouray County, Colorado
Protected areas of San Miguel County, Colorado
Protected areas established in 1980
1980 establishments in Colorado